Taco is a given name and a nickname. Notable people with the name include:

Given name
 Taco Dibbits (born 1968), Dutch art historian
 Taco Kuiper (born 1941), South African investigative journalist
 Taco Ludigman, legendary, possibly fictitious, second potestaat (magistrate governor) of Friesland, elected about 819
 Taco Mesdag (born 1829), Dutch painter
 Taco Ockerse (born 1955), Indonesian-born Dutch singer
 Taco Remkes (born 1984), Dutch golfer
 Taco Scheltema (1766–1837), Dutch portrait painter
 Taco van den Honert (born 1966), Dutch former field hockey player
 Taco van der Hoorn (born 1993), Dutch cyclist

Nickname
 Taco Charlton (born 1994), American National Football League player
 Kenneth Cockrell (born 1950), American retired astronaut and engineer
 Antonio Larreta (1922–2015), Uruguayan writer, critic and actor
 Taco Wallace (born 1981), American former National Football League player

See also
Tacko, given name

Dutch masculine given names
Lists of people by nickname